Leofwine is an Old English name meaning "dear friend." A modern German equivalent is Levin or Lewin. The name may refer to:

Leofwine (bishop of Lindsey), fl. 953
Leofwine, Ealdorman of the Hwicce died 1028
Leofwine Godwinson, killed at the Battle of Hastings
Leofwin, bishop of Lichfield (in office 1053–1070)

Old English given names